Larryboy: The Cartoon Adventures (also known as Larryboy) is an American animated direct-to-video children's series developed by Tom Bancroft (a former animator for Disney) as a spin-off of the VeggieTales franchise created by Big Idea Entertainment. The first video titled "Larryboy and the Angry Eyebrows", was released on March 16, 2002. The videos came to an end with "The Good, The Bad and the Eggly!", released on June 10, 2003, due to Big Idea's bankruptcy. Unlike its predecessor VeggieTales, which was animated in CGI using Softimage 3D and later Autodesk Maya, LarryBoy was animated in 2D animation using Adobe Flash. From September 2006 to September 2009, NBC aired the content of all four videos on its Qubo block alongside airing of VeggieTales videos. Each video contains two segments, a twenty-minute long segment and a seven-minute short segment (Larryboy Super Short).

Premise
The video series revolves around the character Larry's superhero alter ego Larryboy as he tries to manage his life as a superhero while working as a janitor for the Daily Bumble newspaper in Bumblyburg.

Characters

Larryboy: The Cartoon Adventures only carries over four characters from VeggieTales: Larry the Cucumber, Bob the Tomato, Junior Asparagus, and Archibald Asparagus, with Mike Nawrocki, Phil Vischer and Lisa Vischer reprising their respective roles.

Videos

Reception
In a mixed review, Scott Blakey of the Los Angeles Times Syndicate wrote that the series has "sly nods to comic book characters of the 1930s and the so-called golden age of animation" while referring to the series as a "breakthrough in reverse" for its use of 2D animation instead of 3D animation. In a more positive review, Richard LeCornte of the Reno Gazette-Journal writes that the series "succeeds at making its message pleasing to children and adults" and gave the series a B+. 

The series was nominated for a Golden Reel Award in 2003 for Best Sound Editing in Direct to Video, but lost to The Adventures of Tom Thumb & Thumbelina. Vischer stated that fans of the original VeggieTales series criticized the series for its cheap-looking animation. Mixed with Big Idea's bankruptcy at the time, the series was cancelled after the release of only four videos.

Home media
All of the videos were released in both VHS and DVD formats. They were also released as a set or included with the other Larryboy videos in: VeggieTales: Bumblyburg Super-Hero Value Pack (2004), VeggieTales: Larryboy Super Hero Power Pack (2012), and VeggieTales: Larryboy Ultimate Super Hero Collection (2019).

References

External links
 Larryboy: The Cartoon Adventures at the Internet Movie Database
 Official Announcement via Internet Archive

Christian animation
Direct-to-video television series
DreamWorks Classics
VeggieTales